George F. Tardiff (October 2, 1936 – September 21, 2012) was an American football coach at the collegiate and high school level.  He served as the head football coach at Benedictine College in Atchison, Kansas from 1974 to 1976 and Washburn University in Topeka, Kansas from 1983 to 1984, compiling a career college football coaching record of 22–23.

Born in Jersey City, Tardiff played prep football at Lincoln High School before attending St. Benedict's College (now Benedictine College) in Atchison, Kansas.

Coaching career

Benedictine
Tardiff was the head football coach for Benedictine College for three seasons, from 1974 to 1976.  His coaching record at Benedictine was 15–15.

Washburn
Tardiff was the 35th head football coach at Washburn University in Topeka, Kansas, serving for two seasons, from 1983 to 1984.  His coaching record at Washburn was 8–7.

Death
A resident of Brick Township, New Jersey, Tardiff died at Ocean Medical Center after a short illness in 2012.

Head coaching record

College

Notes

References

External links
 

1936 births
2012 deaths
Benedictine Ravens football coaches
Benedictine Ravens football players
St. Mary of the Plains Cavaliers football coaches
Washburn Ichabods football coaches
High school football coaches in New Jersey
Lincoln High School (New Jersey) alumni
People from Brick Township, New Jersey
Sportspeople from Jersey City, New Jersey
Players of American football from Jersey City, New Jersey